St. Mary's Academy of Sto. Niño is the first Catholic school built in the fast-growing Las Villas de Sto. Nino Subdivision. This subdivision is located in the midst of four barrios (towns) of Meycauayan, Bulacan, in the Philippines, namely Iba, Pantoc, Camalig and Perez.

In September 1983, the developer of the subdivision, Mrs. Geronima Que, invited Sister Maria Virginia Banez, Religious of the Virgin Mary (RVM), her former schoolmate, to build a school in the heart of Las Villas de Sto. Niño. The RVM congregation responded to this invitation and with the approval of the Ministry of Education, Culture and Sports (MECS) erected a school on the hectare of land donated by Mrs. Geronima Que. The RVM congregation in turn bought another one and a half hectares to give more space for expansion. On October 14 and 25, 1983, the MECS regional office granted approval to operate the new school.

Construction
Construction started in November 1983. Sister Maria Virginia Banez, RVM, took charge of over-seeing the work and the needs of the school while Sister Maria Aurora Sartin, RVM, worked for the approval of the application to operate both High School and Elementary courses. These permissions were granted temporarily on June 11, 1984.

The RVM sisters of St. Mary's Academy of Meycauayan Saluysoy, took charge of preparing the school for the opening. Enrolment was done in Saluysoy while the construction was going on in Sto. Nino.

Sister Maria Pureza Romano, RVM, and Sis. Maria Eleonor Alpino, RVM, helped in the organization of classes, until Sis. Ma. Pilar Jorge, RVM, arrived in July 1984. She then became the first Principal of St. Mary's Academy of Sto. Nino and at the same time the superior of the community of the RVM sisters.

Expansion
Due to the increase in population of the school, the administration felt there was a need to construct another building to accommodate the students. With the help of Rev. Mother General and her council, a three-story building with 18 classrooms was built in 1992.

In 1993, the convertible stage and canteen were constructed. Between 1997 and 2000, additional school facilities were constructed, such as the CAT headquarters, Guard House, MIC Office, Prayer Room, Computer Laboratory, covered walkway, and the Multi-purpose Kiosks. To serve the students better, the administration began the construction of the Audi-gym and the provision of the Audio-Visual Room and Science Laboratory Room in the year 2001. Since then, SMASN has continually improved its service facilities. During the year 2004–2005, a new Speech Laboratory was set up, equipped with modern gadgets and ten internet stations for both departments. To improve the water supply, the school has constructed an 800-ft deep well.

In April 2004, the construction of a four-storey grade school building was started and this was blessed on February 8, 2005, by His Excellency, Most Rev. Jose Oliveros, D.D., Bishop of Malolos. Immediately after the pupils had transferred to the new building, the renovation of the old building for the different service facilities started. These included the guidance office, AVR, IMC, Health Center, Viewing Room, Dubbing room, Internet Laboratory and Canteen. Through the initiative of the officers of SMASN Supreme Family Council, a covered walkway from the old grade school building to the Audi-Gym was constructed.

In SY 2005–2007, the renovation of the High School building for the different offices, Science Laboratory, NTP lounge, Encoding room, TLE Laboratory and Model House was done.

Construction was completed with the improvement of the Guest House and the construction of the school Chapel.

Silver Jubilee
On January 24, 2009, the school celebrated the 25th anniversary of its foundation. At the same time as the commemoration of the Silver Jubilee year, the Grade School, High School, and the service buildings were re-dedicated to the Holy Child, Our Lady of the Assumption and Venerable Ignacia del Espiritu Santo respectively.

Schools in Bulacan
Catholic elementary schools in the Philippines
Education in Meycauayan